Midnapore is a city in West Bengal, India. It may also refer to:

Places
Midnapore District, former district of West Bengal, India, split during the Partition of Midnapore
Paschim Medinipur district, in West Bengal, India
Midnapore (W), in West Bengal, India
Purba Medinipur district, in West Bengal, India
Midnapore (E), in West Bengal, India
Medinipur Sadar subdivision, in West Bengal, India
Midnapore Sadar (community development block), in West Bengal, India
Medinipur, Bankura, a village in Bankura district, West Bengal, India
Midnapore, Alberta, former community in Alberta, Canada, now a neighbourhood in Calgary, Alberta, Canada

Other
Midnapore College, a college in Midnapore, West Bengal, India
Midnapore Collegiate School, a school in Bengal, India
Medinipur (Lok Sabha constituency), in West Bengal, India
Medinipur (Vidhan Sabha constituency), in West Bengal, India